Centaurea tauromenitana is a species of Centaurea found in Sicily.

References

External links

tauromenitana